Tinian International Airport , also known as West Tinian Airport, is a public airport located on Tinian Island in the United States Commonwealth of the Northern Mariana Islands. This airport is owned by Commonwealth Ports Authority.

This airport is assigned a three-letter location identifier of TNI by the Federal Aviation Administration, but the International Air Transport Association (IATA) airport code is TIQ (IATA assigned TNI to Satna Airport in India). The International Civil Aviation Organization (ICAO) airport code is PGWT. Tinian International Airport is the hub of Star Marianas Air.

Facilities and aircraft
The airport was established on the site of the World War II era West Field.

For 12-month period ending March 31, 2006, the airport had 17,829 aircraft operations, an average of 48 per day: 84% air taxi, 16% general aviation and <1% military.

The head office of Star Marianas Air is in Hangar 1 at the airport.

In May 2012, the United States Marine Corps VMFA-121 operated its F/A-18D Hornets from the airport using M-31 expeditionary aircraft arresting gear systems similar to arresting systems used aboard aircraft carriers during Exercise Geiger Fury.

In 2019 the Commonwealth of the Northern Mariana Islands acting through the Commonwealth Ports Authority and the United States Department of Defense signed an agreement to operate a divert airfield at the airport in case Andersen Air Force Base on Guam is unable to be used.

In early March 2023 United States Air Force Lockheed Martin F-22 Raptors deployed to Tinian for the first time from Kadena Air Base, Okinawa as part of exercise Agile Reaper 21-1.

Airlines and destinations

References

External links

 Commonwealth Ports Authority: Tinian International Airport
 

Tinian
Airports in the Northern Mariana Islands